Godemarci is a settlement in the Slovene Hills in the Municipality of Ljutomer in northeastern Slovenia. The area traditionally belonged to the Styria region and is now included in the Mura Statistical Region.

There is a small chapel-shrine in the settlement. It was built in the second half of the 19th century.

References

External links
Godemarci on Geopedia

Populated places in the Municipality of Ljutomer